Cyrus Cincinato Cuneo  (18 June 187923 July 1916), known as Ciro, was an American-born English visual artist, best known for painting.

Early life
He was born into an Italian American family of artists and musicians. His parents were Giovanni (John) and Annie Cuneo; his brothers Rinaldo (1877-1939) and Egisto (1890–1972), and his son Terence Cuneo (1907–1996) also became artists.

The family lived on Telegraph Hill in San Francisco's Italian American neighborhood of North Beach.  Cuneo's first published drawings appeared in an Italian newspaper when he was 16, and he spent the next three years he worked for the San Francisco Press.

Cuneo trained as a boxer, becoming the fly-weight champion at the Olympic Club in San Francisco and his prize money, together with earnings from spare-time jobs, and the sale of sketches and to travel to Paris to learn painting. The Times reported that he left San Francisco for Paris with £40 in his pocket.

Education
Cuneo began his studies in art while still living in San Francisco, at the Mark Hopkins Art Institute. When he travelled to Paris in 1896, he joined the Colarossi’s studio and trained under Whistler eventually becoming his massier or head student. Cuneo set up an afternoon sketching school with Edith Œnone Somerville (18581949). Teaching sketching and boxing helped Cuneo to support himself in Paris. The Times said that Cuneo had a fine physique and was a notable athlete, and as a boxer was famous not only on the Pacific slope, but also in Paris and in London.

Cuneo was living at 9, Rue Campagne, Première Montparnasse, Paris, in 1900 when he first exhibited at the Royal Academy. He showed two works in that year, both of them illustrations from King Lear by Shakespeare. Cunoe also exhibited at other venues.

Move to London
While Greenwall states that Cuneo moved to London in 1902, Kirkpatrick notes that the 1901 census found him lodging with his future wife's parents in London (while she was still in Paris).

Cuneo married fellow artist Nellie Tenison (28 August 186923 May 1953) in London on 20 October 1903.

Honors and awards
Cuneo was elected ROI in 1908. Cuneo was a successful artist in terms of earning a living. During World War One he painted war subjects in London and the sale by auction of one of his paintings paid for two motor ambulances for the front.

Cuneo's illustration work was unusual in that he often painted in oils on board. Peppin and Micklethwait state that Cuneo worked with considerable panache in crayon or in black and white oil on board painted without preliminary pencil drafts.  Thorpe considered one of his illustrations for The Pall Mall Magazine in 1900 to be a beauty and reproduced it in his survey of English illustration in the 1890s. Cuneo was selected by Percy Bradshaw for inclusion in his 1918 The Art of the Illustrator which included a portfolio for each of twenty illustrators.

Death
Cuneo got blood poisoning after being accidentally scratched with a hat-pin at a dance. He died on 23 July 1916. His estate was valued at £13,798 17s. 6d. and his wife Nellie acted as his executor.

Notes

References

External links
 
 
 
 
 Cuneo: A Family of Early California Artists, 2009, Museo ItaloAmericano,  San Francisco, California
 The Cuneo Society Website
 Cyrus's page on Terence Cuneo Website
 Drink : a love story on a great question by Hall Caine, 1906, illustrated by Cyrus Cuneo

1879 births
1916 deaths
19th-century American painters
20th-century American painters
Académie Carmen alumni
Académie Colarossi alumni
American male painters
Painters from California
19th-century American male artists
Deaths from sepsis
20th-century American male artists
American emigrants to the United Kingdom